D.P.G. Recordz (short for Dogg Pound Gangstaz Recordz) is a record label founded by Daz Dillinger and Soopafly after he and Kurupt left Death Row Records.

Discography 
 Daz Dillinger - R.A.W (2000)
 Daz Dillinger - Long Beach 2 Fillmoe (with JT the Bigga Figga) (2001)
 Daz Dillinger - Game for Sale (with JT the Bigga Figga) (2001)
 D.P.G - Dillinger & Young Gotti (2001)
 Soopafly - Dat Whoopty Woop (2001)
 Who Ride wit Us: Tha Compalation, Vol. 1 (2001)
 Makaveli & Dillinger Don't Go 2 Sleep (2001)
 Daz Dillinger - This Is The Life I Lead (2002)
 To Live and Die in CA (2002)
 Who Ride wit Us: Tha Compalation, Vol. 2 (2002)
 Kurupt - Same Day, Different Shit (2006)
 Daz Dillinger - Only on the Left Side (2008)
 Daz Dillinger - Public Enemiez (2009)
 Daz Dillinger - Witit Witit (2012)
 Daz Dillinger - Weed Money (2014)

See also 
 List of record labels

American independent record labels
Hip hop record labels
Record labels established in 2000
Snoop Dogg
Gangsta rap record labels